Herarun (also Romanized as Herārūn and Ḩerārūn; also known as Aḩrāron, Aḩrārūn, and Hezārūn) is a village in Howmeh Rural District, in the Central District of Bam County, Kerman Province, Iran. At the 2006 census, its population was 233, in 69 families.

References 

Populated places in Bam County